The chapters of the Japanese shōjo manga series Hot Gimmick were written and illustrated by Miki Aihara and serialized in the monthly manga anthology Betsucomi from the December 2000 issue to the August 2005 issue. Shogakukan then collected the 54 chapters into 12 tankōbon volumes, with volume 1 released on May 26, 2001, and volume 12 released on October 26, 2005. Shogakukan later re-released the series in six bunkoban volumes, with the first volume released on October 15, 2008 and the sixth on December 16, 2008.

In July 2003, Viz Media announced that they had licensed Hot Gimmick for an English-language translation and distribution in North America. Volume 1 was released on October 29, 2003, and volume 12 on September 19, 2006. Viz announced at Anime Expo 2008 that they would re-release Hot Gimmick in an omnibus "Vizbig" edition. The first omnibus volume, containing volumes 1 through 3, was released on March 17, 2009. Hot Gimmick has also been licensed in Italian by Planet Manga.

Hot Gimmick was adapted into a novel titled , written by Nishizaki Megumi and featuring illustrations by Miki Aihara. It was released in Japan by Shogakukan on November 1, 2005, and in North America by Viz Media on February 20, 2007. The novel features an alternate ending from the manga, focusing instead on the relationship between Hatsumi and Shinogu.



Volume list

References 

Hot Gimmick